Club Deportivo Atlético Morazán  is a Salvadoran professional football club based in Tierra de Fuego, Morazán,  El Salvador.

External links
 Messi y Tonito - El Diario de Hoy 

Football clubs in El Salvador
Association football clubs established in 1970
1970 establishments in El Salvador